The Tuvalu A-Division for women is the top level women's football league in Tuvalu. The league is organized by the Tuvalu National Football Association.

The league was founded in 2009.

Teams
The 2013 season was played by the following 4 teams:

2012 season

The 2012 Tuvalu A-Division (women) was the 4th season of top flight association football in Tuvalu. The league was won by Tamanuku.

List of Champions
2009: Tamanuku
2010: Tofaga
2011:
2012: Tamanuku
2013: Nui
2014: Naut

References

 
Sports leagues established in 2009
Women's association football leagues in Oceania
A-Division women
A-Division women
2009 establishments in Tuvalu